The Internal Security Forces Directorate (abbreviated ISF) is the national police and security force of Lebanon.

Modern police were established in Lebanon in 1861, with creation of the Gendarmerie. In April 2005, Ashraf Rifi became head of the ISF, replacing Ali Hajj. Rifi then started to recruit younger members to become part of Lebanese Intelligence. His term ended in April 2013, and he was replaced by Roger Salem, and Ibrahim Basbouss subsequently. On March 8, 2017, the Lebanese Cabinet appointed Imad Othman director-general of the ISF. He took command the following day.

The number of personnel reached 30,000 people by 2000 and has grown to over 40,000 by 2013. The ISF National Day in Lebanon is on the 9th of June.

Missions
Their missions include :
 Maintaining public order.
 Highway patrol.
 Counter-terrorism.

Organization
The ISF organization includes:

 The Ministry of the interior
 Inspector-General
 Directorate General of Internal Security Forces
 Staff
 Territorial Gendarmerie
 Mobile Gendarmerie
 Judicial Police
 Central Administration
 Beirut Police
 ISF Institute
 Social Services
 Commander of the Security of Embassies and Public Administration

Elite Forces
Three Special Forces Teams operate in the ISF.

1- Special Operations Group-Judicial Police.

It consists of SWAT unit and BRI unit. 

2- Strike Force - Information Department. 

3- Black Panthers - Mobile Forces

Current Director

Imad Othman

Directors
List of General Directors of ISF:
Imad Othman, Major-General, General Director of the Internal Security Forces from 2017
Ibrahim Basbous, Major-General, General Director of the Internal Security Forces from 2013 to 2017
Achraf Rifi, Major-General, General Director of the Internal Security Forces from 2005 to 2013
Ali El Hajj, Major-General, General Director of the Internal Security Forces from 2004 to 2005
Marouan Zein, Major-General, General Director of the Internal Security Forces from 2001 to 2004
Abed El Karim Ibrahim, Major-General, General Director of the Internal Security Forces from 1998 to 2001
Rafic El Hassan, Major-General, General Director of the Internal Security Forces from 1993 to 1998
Mohammad Salim Kobrosly, Major-General, General Director of the Internal Security Forces from 1990 to 1993
Omar Makhzoumi, Major-General, General Director of the Internal Security Forces from 1987 to 1990
Osman Osman, Major-General, General Director of the Internal Security Forces from 1983 to 1987
Hicham El Chaar, Civilian, General Director of the Internal Security Forces from 1982 to 1983
Ahmad El Hajj, Major-General (Army), General Director of the Internal Security Forces from 1977 to 1982
Hicham El Chaar, Civilian, General Director of the Internal Security Forces from 1971 to 1977
Mahmoud Hafez, Civilian, General Director of the Internal Security Forces from 1970 to 1971
Mahmoud El Banna , Civilian, General Director of the Internal Security Forces from 1964 to 1970
Jamil El Hosami, Leader (Army), General Director of the Internal Security Forces from 1962 to 1964
Nour Eddin Al Rifai, Leader, General Director of the Internal Security Forces from 1959 to 1962

See also
 General Security Directorate (Lebanon)
 Lebanese Air Force
 Lebanese Armed Forces
 Lebanese Navy

References

External links
 Lebanese Internal Security Forces

Law enforcement agencies of Lebanon
1861 establishments in the Ottoman Empire